Chakrian is a village in union council of Langay (near Mangowall) in Gujrat District of Pakistan.

Demographics 
The village has a population of around 5000. It is situated 23 kilometers west of the city of Gujrat. It is one of the very backward villages of Gujrat where electricity came in late '80s.

History 
The village was named after the influential Sardar Chakar Singhan, a Sikh Sardar. In the 17th century, the Sufi saint Shah Sharif converted the residents of the village to Islam.

Sports 
Volleyball, Cricket, Kabaddi and Badminton are popular sports.

Facilities 
After a long phase of darkness, the village of Chakrian offers gas, electricity, Internet and 3G/4G wireless communications now.

Education 
The five schools in Chakrian are:
 Government Middle School (for boys, ~400 students)
 Government Middle School (for girls, ~250 students)
 Rizvan Public Model School (co-education, ~200 students)
 Quaid-e-Azam public model school (co-education, ~200 students)
 Shaan-e Pakistan Elementary school (co-education)

Languages
The majority of inhabitants speak Punjabi. Other languages include Urdu, the national language of Pakistan and English.

Governance

2002 general election
During the 2002 elections, former Prime Minister of Pakistan Chaudhry Shujaat Hussain defeated Ahmad Mukhtar for NA-105 constituency. At village level, Chaudhry Shujaat Hussain won with a majority of 500 votes. For PP-110, former Chief Minister of Punjab Chaudhry Pervez Elahi won election. Chaudhry Pervez Elahi won with a majority of 400 votes at village level.

2008 general election
In the 2008 general election, Ahmad Mukhtar won. In the Punjab Assembly, the village was represented by Chaudhry Moonis Elahi. At the village level (For NA-105), Ahmad Mukhtar received 641 votes and Chaudhry Shujaat Hussain received 459 votes. For PP-110. Nasir Mehmood, of People's Party, got 640 votes while Moonis Elahi could bag only 470 votes.

2013 general election
In the 2013 general election, PMLQ representative Chaudhry Pervez Elahi won the constituency "NA105" by a margin of 15000 Votes. For PP-110, Moonis Elahi won by huge margin of 30000. At Village level PMLQ got a lead of 604 Votes over PMLN and PPPP.  
Former Law Minister Of Punjab, Raja Muhammad Basharat, also won previously from there. It remains in the consistency of Chaudhry Zahoor Elahi Shaheed.

Former Deputy Mayor of Union Council Langay belongs to Chakrian.

Local politicians 
Local representatives of political parties of Pakistan are as follows:
PML-Q Chaudhry Talib Hussain, Former Mayor Of .
PML-Q Chaudry Nusrat Iqbal (Deputy Nazim) UC langay
PML N Chaudhry Muhammad Asghar
PPPP Chaudhry Ali Bahadur

References

Populated places in Gujrat District